The promising town of Judsonville was named after Egbert Judson a businessman from San Francisco and one of the owners of the Empire coal mine in 1878. The town was five miles south of Antioch, and three and a half miles from the town of Somersville. It boasts two first-class hotels with reasonable rates. Several private boarding houses, a goods store also housed the Post Office. The Post Office operated from 1878 to 1883 with a brief closure in 1879. A schoolhouse for the local children, a lodge for the Good Templars, a Sabbath school, and a hall in which the traveling preacher would give his praise to god with the townspeople of Judsonville.
Coal was discovered near Judsonville as early as 1852. But the coal business started in that town with the Judsonville Coal company in 1875.
The Judsonville Coal company had the most up-to-date mining pumps and equipment. The mines had one standard steam pump, one Blake steam pump 
These pumps were used to extract the water from the mine shafts. Due to the considerable amounts of water in the Diablo coal range, it was necessary to have the best pumps available
There were also seven different size boilers. the coal bunker was 84 feet long by 20 feet wide. The company had constructed a narrow-gauge railroad from Antioch to the mine. The railroad had been equipped with one powerful locomotive and 40 iron carts with a 5 ton each capacity. The coal is shipped to Sacramento and Stockton and considerable quantities of the coal are consumed for domestic purposes in San Francisco. The company is shipping some 200 tons per month.
The town and the Judsonville Coal Company employed two blacksmiths and a blacksmith helper, two carpenters, four engineers, four pumpmen, four firemen, fifty miners, nine carmen, and one intelligent Superintendent. The company seemed to be financially sound and well maintained.
At Judsonville heyday, there were about 300 residents as of 1878.

As a once thriving community within the Mt. Diablo Coal Fields, It all began and then it ended so soon and the resident moved away by the early 1900s

The town's namesake made a name and a career for himself in the San Francisco Bay area. Born Egbert Judson on August 9, 1812, in Syracuse New York, Came to the San Francisco Bay Area in 1852, Establishing the Judson Manufacturing Company. He became a millionaire and never married. He died on January 9, 1893.-80years old
     
A MILLIONAIRE'S DEATH.

Egbert Judson, a Popular Business Man, Passes Away. Egbert Judson, one the best-known and certainly one of the most popular businessmen in the city, died yesterday afternoon at his residence, on Fifteenth and Valencia streets, after a few weeks of illness. General debility was the cause of his demise, he being nearly 81 years of age. The deceased was a great favorite among all with whom He came in contact, both socially and in a business way. A whole-souled, generous, liberal-minded, but shrewd man, Mr. Judson accumulated a large fortune since he arrived here in 1852 and founded the first assay works San Francisco ever had. Later on he became interested in hydraulic and quartz mines in Sierra, Placer, Amador and other counties, and then he established the original giant powder works. Up to his death he was president of the Judson Manufacturing Company and of the California Paper Company. Egbert Judson was never married and his millions will go to the children of his late brother, who are four in number. They are Mrs. Michael Lynch (widow of the late Supervisor). Mrs. George H. Benedict, Charles Judson and Henry Judson.

 

Information from the Antioch Ledger 1878 & 1879
Judsonville was a city in eastern Contra Costa County, California. It was a mining town for the nearby coal mines.

A post office operated at Judsonville from 1878 to 1883, with a closure in 1879. The name is in honor of Egbert Judson, part owner of a mine.

Notes

Ghost towns in California
Ghost towns in the San Francisco Bay Area
Company towns in California
Former settlements in Contra Costa County, California
Populated places established in 1878